Ernest Harold Conwell (born August 17, 1972) is an American former professional football player who was a  tight end in the National Football League (NFL). He was drafted by the St. Louis Rams in the second round of the 1996 NFL Draft. He played college football at Washington.

Conwell also played for the New Orleans Saints.  He currently works for the NFL Players Association.

Early years

Conwell graduated from Kentwood High School in Covington, Washington in 1991 right after setting the school record for 800g javelin at 195'1". While there he won the 1990 Washington State 4A Championship in shot put and lettered in football, basketball and track and field for javelin and shot.
His nephew, Will Conwell, was also a track and field thrower at Kentwood who set two school records in 2000, 59'4.5" for shot put and 177'9" for discus.

During Conwell's senior year at Washington, he finished with 24 catches for 343 yards and 2 TDs. Until that year, he played behind fellow tight end Mark Bruener.

Professional career
Conwell was drafted  by the St. Louis Rams in the second round of the 1996 NFL Draft. Conwell missed the end of the 1998 season and most of the 1999 season following November 1998 knee surgery, but did play in the Super Bowl. Despite the injuries, Conwell was re-signed by the Rams in early 2000 to a three-year contract for the 2000–2002 seasons. The 2001 season was Conwell’s best, as he notched 38 receptions for 431 yards and was named second-team All-Pro. In 2002, his last season with the Rams, he played in all 16 games and started 11, and finished the season with 34 receptions for 429 yards.

He played for the New Orleans Saints from 2003 until he was released on February 28, 2007.

References

1972 births
Living people
Sportspeople from Renton, Washington
American football tight ends
Players of American football from Washington (state)
Washington Huskies football players
New Orleans Saints players
St. Louis Rams players
Sportspeople from Kent, Washington
Kentwood High School (Washington) alumni
Ed Block Courage Award recipients